Three wishes may refer to:

Film and television
The Three Wishes (1937 Dutch film), directed by Kurt Gerron 
The Three Wishes (1937 Italian film), directed by Giorgio Ferroni and Kurt Gerron
Three Wishes, a 1988 Hong Kong film starring Anita Mui
Three Wishes (film), a 1995 American film starring Patrick Swayze
Three Wishes, a Greek TV movie starring Christoforos Papakaliatis
Three Wishes (American TV series), a 2005 reality show
Three Wishes (Singaporean TV series), a 2014 drama serial
Three Wishes, a 1988 Barney and the Backyard Gang home video

Music
Les trois souhaits (The three wishes), an opera by Bohuslav Martinů composed in the late 1920s but premiered in 1971
Three Wishes (Miki Howard album) or the title song, 2001
Three Wishes (Spyro Gyra album) or the title song, 1992
"3 Wishes", a song by Billy Crawford from Big City, 2004
"Three Wishes", a song by Dance Gavin Dance from Afterburner, 2020
"Three Wishes", a song by Klaus Nomi from Simple Man, 1982
"Three Wishes", a song by the Pierces from Thirteen Tales of Love and Revenge, 2007
"Three Wishes", a song by Roger Waters from Amused to Death, 1992

See also
Jinn in popular culture, for examples of the three-wishes theme in fiction
Three Wishes (food)
Three wishes joke
Seven Wishes (disambiguation)
Wish (disambiguation)